Ajjavara, Chik Ballapur  is a village in the southern state of Karnataka, India. It is located in the Chik Ballapur taluk of Kolar district in Karnataka.

See also
 Kolar
 Districts of Karnataka

References

External links
 http://Kolar.nic.in/

Villages in Kolar district